Maisonneuve—Rosemount (also known as Maisonneuve) was a federal electoral district in Quebec, Canada, that was represented in the House of Commons of Canada from 1935 to 1979.

This riding was created in 1933 from parts of Maisonneuve riding.

The electoral district was abolished in 1966 when it was redistributed between Gamelin, Lafontaine and a new Maisonneuve riding.

The new Maisonneuve riding was created from parts of Hochelaga, Mercier and Maisonneuve—Rosemont ridings. The name of this electoral district was changed in 1970 to "Maisonneuve—Rosemont". It was abolished in 1976 when it was redistributed into Gamelin, Maisonneuve, Rosemont and Saint-Léonard ridings.

Members of Parliament

This riding elected the following Members of Parliament:

Election results

Maisonneuve—Rosemont, 1935–1968

Maisonneuve, 1968–1972

Maisonneuve—Rosemont, 1972–1979

See also 

 List of Canadian federal electoral districts
 Past Canadian electoral districts

External links

Riding history from the Library of Parliament:
Maisonneuve (1892 - 1933)
Maisonneuve—Rosemont (1933-1966)
Maisonneuve (1966 - 1970)
Maisonneuve—Rosemont (1970-1976)
Maisonneuve (1976-1978)

Former federal electoral districts of Quebec